Daniel Tioumentsev (born March 14, 2002) is an American pair skater. With his skating partner, Sophia Baram, he is the 2023 World Junior champion, 2022–23 Junior Grand Prix Final silver medalist, the 2022 JGP Czech Republic champion, the 2022 JGP Poland II bronze medalist, and the 2022 U.S. junior national champion.

Personal life 
Tioumentsev was born on March 14, 2002, in El Paso, Texas, to parents Andrei, an electrical engineer, and Anna, a figure skating coach. He has a brother, Dimitri. Tioumentsev is a graduate of Palmer Ridge High School and currently studies mechanical engineering at Irvine Valley College. He hopes to one day work for SpaceX.

Programs

With Baram

Competitive highlights 
JGP: Junior Grand Prix

Pairs with Baram

Pairs with Prudsky

Pairs with Mishkutionok

Pairs with Burden

Pairs with Flaum

Men's Singles

References

External links 
 

2002 births
Living people
American male figure skaters
American male pair skaters
People from El Paso, Texas